Eeva Park (born September 9, 1950 in Tallinn) is an Estonian writer.

Life
Park was born Eeva Hint in 1950. She is the daughter of writers Aadu Hint and Minni Nurme.  After high school she worked as a silk and porcelain painter, and as an archival assistant.  She began her career in 1983 as a poet, but soon turned to prose. Her 1993 novel Tolm ja Tuul describes in a fairly obvious way the breakup of his parents' marriage. She is known for her novels' dark undertones, but she has also written plays and short stories, as well as continuing to write poetry.  Park has been a member of the Estonian Writers' Union since 1993.  In 1994 she received the Friedebert Tuglas Literature Prize.  She currently lives in Saku Parish.

Works
  Mõrkjas tuul (poems, 1983)
  Hullu Hansu lugu (novel, 1988)
  Öö valgus (poems, 1990)
  Tolm yes tuul (novel, 1992)
  Mees, kes mäletas ELEVANT (short stories, 1994)
  Palveränd (Drama, 1996)
  Naru õpilane (novel, 1998)
  Pääse karussellile (short stories, 2000)
  Vaba long mine (poems, 2002)
  locomotives lõpmatuses (novel, 2003)
  Homsed uudised (poems, 2005)
  Absoluutne champions (short stories, 2006)

References

This article is a translation of the corresponding article on the German Wikipedia.

1950 births
Living people
Estonian women novelists
Estonian women short story writers
Estonian women poets
20th-century Estonian novelists
20th-century Estonian poets
20th-century Estonian women writers
21st-century Estonian novelists
21st-century Estonian poets
21st-century Estonian women writers
Writers from Tallinn
20th-century short story writers
21st-century short story writers